Typhoon Hato, known in the Philippines as Severe Tropical Storm Isang, was a strong tropical cyclone that struck South China in August 2017. Developing as the thirteenth named storm and the fourth typhoon of the Pacific typhoon season, Hato formed as a tropical depression over the east of Luzon on 19 August. The system further developed and became a tropical storm the next day. On 21 August, Hato emerged over the northern portion of the South China Sea and reached typhoon intensity. Rapid intensification ensued on 23 August, and Hato became a Category 3-equivalent typhoon before making landfall over Jinwan, Zhuhai. The storm further weakened over land and dissipated on 24 August.

One of the strongest typhoons to impact Macau and Hong Kong in the past 50 years, Hato caused significant damage totaling US$6.82 billion along its path. The bulk of the losses were incurred in Mainland China, where Hato brought a storm surge that caused severe flooding in several provinces along the Pearl River, in addition to wind gusts that reached . Both Hong Kong and Macau had their tropical cyclone signals raised to the highest category in anticipation of the storm, which inflicted more than US$1 billion worth of damage in each of those areas. Also, while weakening, Hato brought heavy rain and a tornado to Vietnam. A total of 24 fatalities occurred due to Hato.

Hato made landfall along the southern coast of Zhuhai with a Category-3 intensity (both 1-min and 2-min sustained wind speed of 185 km/h), strong but not stronger than other more powerful storms. Three other major typhoons, Wanda (1962), Ruby (1964), and Vicente (2012), followed a similar trajectory as that of Hato (from ESE to WNW), making landfall on slightly different parts of the coast. Hato's forward speed was the fastest of these typhoons, reaching , nearly twice as fast as the speed of Wanda.

Meteorological history

During the late hours of 18 August, the Joint Typhoon Warning Center (JTWC) started to monitor a tropical disturbance that had developed about 1,495 km (930 mi) southeast of Taipei, Taiwan. By 19 August, the Japan Meteorological Agency (JMA) began to monitor the area of low-pressure as a tropical depression. Around the same time, the JTWC issued a Tropical Cyclone Formation Alert (TCFA), while the JMA initiated advisories as it was determined that the system had 10-minute sustained winds of 55 km/h (35 mph). By 03:00 UTC on 20 August, the JTWC began issuing advisories, designating the system as a tropical depression with the numerical designation of 15W. The PAGASA named 15W as Isang, as system was already a tropical cyclone and was located within their area of responsibility. Six hours later, the JMA upgraded the system to a tropical storm, assigning the name Hato.

At 15:00 UTC of 20 August, the JTWC upgraded Hato to a tropical storm after the storm further organized. By this time, Hato was located in a favorable environment with low vertical wind shear and sea-surface temperatures (SSTs) of 30 °C (86 °F). Hato failed to strengthen throughout most of 21 August due to a partially exposed low-level circulation center (LLCC) with sheared convection. Several hours later, the system's LLCC became broad as convection began to develop. By 22 August, SSTs near the storm rose to 31 °C (87.8 °F), therefore the JMA had upgraded Hato to a severe tropical storm. The system had rapidly consolidated as it formed a 20-nm diameter eye, including a significant improved convective structure with tightly curved banding flowing into the systems LLCC. Both agencies upgraded Hato to a typhoon six hours later, despite its eye losing its structure.

Early on 23 August, the JTWC upgraded Hato to a Category 2 typhoon after its eye began to reform with a central dense overcast. Hato reached its peak intensity as a Category 3-equivalent typhoon with Dvorak estimates reaching T5.5. The JMA estimated peak 10-minute sustained winds of 150 km/h (90 mph) with a minimum barometric pressure of 960 hPa, which was revised to 140 km/h and 965 hPa during post-analysis. However, a minimum pressure of 945 hPa was recorded in Macau, and the CMA estimated a minimum pressure of 935 hPa, suggesting that its intensity was higher. Hato made landfall over the southern coast of Zhuhai, Guangdong at 12:50 CST (04:50 UTC). About three hours later, the JTWC issued its final warning on Hato as the storm moved further inland. Six hours later, the JMA downgraded Hato to a severe tropical storm, then to a tropical storm. The JMA continued to track Hato until 06:00 UTC on 24 August.

Impact

China 
In total, 32 people were killed while total damages in Mainland China were counted to CN¥28.91 billion (US$4.34 billion).

Hong Kong 
For the first time in five years, since Typhoon Vicente in 2012, the Hong Kong Observatory issued the Hurricane Signal, No.10, which is the highest level of tropical cyclone warning signals in Hong Kong. It is the highest record in 132 years. The Air Quality Health Index has also reached level 8 in a lot of Air Quality Monitoring Stations. Consequently, Hong Kong saw the closure of businesses, government offices, schools, courts and the stock market. At least 121 cases of injury were reported due to the passage of the storm. Major damage to property, such as broken windows and collapsed scaffolding, were widely reported, with more than 692 reports of fallen trees, debris, displaced bins, and glass shards littering the pavements and major roads. Serious flooding were reported in low-lying areas, such as Heng Fa Chuen on Hong Kong Island, Lei Yue Mun and Tai O due to storm surge. More than 450 flights were cancelled or delayed at Hong Kong International Airport and public transport was brought to a standstill. The estimated economic cost was around HK$4 billion (US$511 million).

Macau 

The storm was the strongest to have hit Macau in 53 years, according to Macau's Chief Executive Fernando Chui, and it was the first time in 18 years that the Macao Meteorological and Geophysical Bureau hoisted a No. 10 tropical cyclone signal. Most areas of the territory was hit by major flooding and property damages, with citywide power and water outage lasting for at least 24 hours after the passage of the storm. Overall, 10 deaths and at least 200 injuries were reported. The head of the Macao Meteorological and Geophysical Bureau resigned due to criticisms by the Macanese public that officials failed to predict the ferocity of the storm. The Corruption Agency is investigating The Meteorology Bureau's forecasting procedures and management, including the former director Fong Soi-Kun. The Macau SAR Government also announced 1.3 billion Macanese patacas would be set aside for those affected by the typhoon, with families of victims to get up to 300,000 patacas (US$37 thousand) each. In total, Macau suffered an economic loss of 12.55 billion patacas (US$1.56 billion).

There were shortages of basic supplies locally due to residents buying up remaining stocks in response to the utilities shortages and flooding. At the request of the local government, the Chinese People's Liberation Army Macau Garrison was deployed to assist in disaster relief and cleaning up for the first time in Macau history. About 1,000 troops were called in to help remove debris and clear roads. Macau police arrested two people for using phone to spread unverified information alleging that the authorities had sought to cover up the discovery of bodies in a car park during Typhoon Hato.

A typhoon and storm surge coupling model demonstrated that the maximum storm surge height reached nearly  along the coast of Macau, while that in Hong Kong was slightly below . Furthermore, a field survey of urban flooding revealed evidence of a 2.25-m inundation in downtown Macau and a 0.55-m inundation on Lantau Island, Hong Kong, which were likely exacerbated by a combination of storm surge, heavy rainfall, and surface water runoff over a complex hilly terrain.

Vietnam 
Despite passing well to the north of Vietnam, the storm triggered heavy rainfall and a tornado in Lào Cai, Vietnam on 23 August. More than 754 houses were damaged in Sa Pa, which injured one person. The storm killed one person and total damage reached 7 billion₫ (US$308 thousand). Total damage in Vietnam from the remnants of Hato reached 31 billion₫ (US$1.36 million).

Retirement

Due to the extensive damage and high death toll in South China, the name Hato was officially retired during the 50th annual session of the ESCAP/WMO Typhoon Committee in February 2018. In February 2019, the Typhoon Committee subsequently chose Yamaneko as its replacement name.

See also

Weather of 2017
Tropical cyclones in 2017
 Typhoon Vicente
 Typhoon Mangkhut (2018)
 Tropical Storm Higos (2020)
 Typhoon Hagupit (2008)
 Typhoon Usagi (2013)
 Tropical Storm Nida (2016)

References

External links

JMA General Information of Typhoon Hato (1713) from Digital Typhoon

15W.HATO from the U.S. Naval Research Laboratory
South China Morning Post Topic : Typhoon Hato

2017 Pacific typhoon season
2017 disasters in the Philippines
Typhoons in the Philippines
Typhoons in China
Typhoons in Hong Kong
Typhoons in Vietnam
2017 disasters in China
2017 in Hong Kong
2017 disasters in Vietnam
Hato
Typhoons in Macau
2017 in Macau